The 2008 Karl Schäfer Memorial (also known as the Vienna Cup) took place from October 14 through 17, 2008 at the Vienna Ice Arena. Skaters competed in the disciplines of men's singles, ladies' singles, and ice dancing.

Results

Men

Ladies

Ice dancing

External links
 2008 Karl Schäfer Memorial

Karl Schäfer Memorial
Karl Schafer Memorial, 2008
Karl Schafer Memorial